Fighter Squadron 21 (Hävittäjälentolaivue 21, HävLLv 21) was a Finnish fighter squadron located in Pirkkala, near Tampere. It was the operational part of the Satakunta Air Command. The squadron was disbanded in June 2014, with the fighters being split between Karelian Air Command and Lapland Air Command.

Organization
1st Flight Fighter flight, flew F-18C/D and also trained mechanics
2nd Flight Fighter flight, flew F-18C/D and trained pilots
Liaison Flight Flew Valmet Vinka, PA-31-350 Chieftain, and Valmet L-90TP Redigo aircraft

References

Sources
 www.ilmavoimat.fi

21
Pirkkala